The University of Otago College of Education/Creative New Zealand Children's Writer in Residence is a six-month Fellowship for children's writers who normally live in New Zealand.

History and conditions 

This residency was first offered in 1992 when it was run by the Dunedin College of Education, with Ruth Corrin being the first recipient. It is the only such residency offered to a children's writer by any tertiary institution in New Zealand and is awarded for a six-month period between February and August each year. The award includes a stipend of $28,000 (funded by the University of Otago and Creative New Zealand) and the use of an office within the College of Education.

In 2017, Dunedin UNESCO City of Literature won a bid for a free stand at the Bologna Children's Book Fair, and writers who had held the University of Otago College of Education Creative New Zealand Children's Writing Residency were highlighted and celebrated in the display.

The Robert Lord Cottage 

The recipient of the residency has the option, if wanted, of rent-free accommodation in the Robert Lord Cottage. This hundred-year-old brick cottage at 3 Titan Street, Dunedin North, was once owned by New Zealand playwright Robert Lord. Before his death in 1992, Lord set up the ‘Writers Cottage Trust’ with the aim of allowing the cottage to be used in the future as a rent-free home for writers-in-residence.

Recipients

See also
Robert Burns Fellowship

References

Awards and prizes of the University of Otago
New Zealand children's literary awards